"Heigh-Ho" is a song from Walt Disney's 1937 animated film Snow White and the Seven Dwarfs, written by Frank Churchill (music) and Larry Morey (lyrics). It is sung by the group of Seven Dwarfs as they work at a mine with diamonds and rubies, and is one of the best-known songs in the film. It is also the first appearance of the seven dwarfs. The other Dwarf Chorus songs are "Bluddle-Uddle-Um-Dum" (the washing-up song) and "The Silly Song".

The expression "heigh-ho" was first recorded in 1553 and is defined as an expression of "yawning, sighing, languor, weariness, disappointment". Eventually, it blended meanings with the similarly spelled "hey-ho". The phrase "hey-ho" first appeared in print in 1471, according to the Oxford English Dictionary, which says it has nautical origins, meant to mark the rhythm of movement in heaving or hauling.

The song was recorded by Horace Heidt and his Brigadiers, with vocal chorus sung by The Kings and Glee Club, for Brunswick Records in January, 1938 (Brunswick 8074). The record made it to No. 4 on Your Hit Parade in April 1938 and stayed on the charts for 10 weeks.

In Disney-related media

Film, stage and television 
Donald Duck sings this song in "The Volunteer Worker", and "The Riveter". In The Goodies 1984 Gremlins final series special Snow White 2 the trio and the dwarfs sing the song in the beginning. 

The song was also featured in the 1979 stage adaption of the 1937 animated musical film. In the 1988 Disney animated film Oliver & Company, Tito sings "Heigh-Ho, Heigh-Ho, it's home from work we go" when he is rescuing Jenny.

Music 
The song appears, with altered lyrics, at the finale of Walt Disney's Enchanted Tiki Room at Disneyland and Walt Disney World's Magic Kingdom, and is also used at the Seven Dwarfs Mine Train attraction. In 1955, Jack Pleis recorded it for his album, Music from Disneyland.

Los Lobos recorded a Spanish-language cover of this song for their 2009 album Los Lobos Goes Disney. On the 2011 album V-Rock Disney, which features visual kei artists covering Disney songs, Cascade covered this song. Dave Brubeck's version of the song appears on the soundtrack to the 2013 movie Saving Mr. Banks.

See also
Snow White and the Seven Dwarfs (soundtrack)

References

1937 songs
Songs from Snow White and the Seven Dwarfs (1937 film)
Music published by Bourne Co. Music Publishers
Songs with music by Frank Churchill
Songs with lyrics by Larry Morey
Songs written for films
Seven Dwarfs